Primrose Path is an album led by trombonist Jimmy Knepper with saxophonist Bobby Wellins which was recorded in 1980 and originally released on the Scottish Hep label. The album was rereleased on CD in 1994 along with Just Friends as Special Relationship.

Track listing 
All compositions by Jimmy Knepper except where noted.
 "Primrose Path" – 12:37
 "What is There to Say" (Vernon Duke, Yip Harburg) – 4:53  
 "Song for Keith" (Pete Jacobsen) – 3:02
 "Gnome on the Range – 8:44
 "'Round Midnight" (Thelonious Monk) – 6:08 
 "Latter Day Saint" – 7:16

Personnel 
Jimmy Knepper – trombone
Bobby Wellins – tenor saxophone
Pete Jacobsen – piano
Dave Green – bass
Ron Parry – drums

References 

Jimmy Knepper albums
Bobby Wellins albums
1980 albums
Hep Records albums